Mattigaikurichi is a village in Kallakurichi District in State of Tamil Nadu, India.

This small village is located on the north bank of the river Gomuki, It is 6 km away from Kallakurichi, in Sankarapuram Taluk, Villupuram District.

As per 2011 India census, Mattigaikurichi had a population of 1658. Males constitute 49% of the population and females 51%. Most of the villagers are farmers.

There is an elementary school, built by the villagers and since 1969 there has also been a Government Middle school.

Demographics

According to 2011 census, Mattigaikurichi had a population of 1658 with a sex-ratio of 848 Females & 810 Males. The average literacy of the village was 67.08% and there were a total of 1300 workers, comprising 840 cultivators, 400 main agricultural labourers.

Climate
The climate is moderate to hot, with the maximum temperature being 38 °C and the minimum at 21 °C. The Village gets its rainfall from the northeast monsoon during the winter months and the southwest monsoon during the summer months. The average annual rainfall is 1,070 mm.

References

Cities and towns in Kallakurichi district